Changfeng County  is a county of Anhui Province, East China, it is under the administration of the prefecture-level city of Hefei, the capital of Anhui. It is the northernmost county-level division of Hefei, the provincial capital. It contains 9 towns, 6 townships, and a development zone.

In 2014 Changfeng County offered 1,000 RMB in cash ($140) to each family who gave newborns the mothers' surname, in order improve the imbalanced sex ratio./

Administrative divisions
Changfeng County is divided to 9 towns 6 townships and 1 other.
Towns

Townships

Others
Shuangfeng Development Zone

Climate

References

Hefei
County-level divisions of Anhui